James Thackeray Jeffers (9 November 1912 – 22 January 1992) was an Australian rules footballer who played with North Melbourne in the Victorian Football League (VFL).

Notes

External links 

1912 births
1992 deaths
Australian rules footballers from Melbourne
North Melbourne Football Club players
People from Oakleigh, Victoria